Klement Gottwald (23 November 1896 – 14 March 1953) was a Czech communist politician, who was the leader of the Communist Party of Czechoslovakia from 1929 until his death in 1953–titled as general secretary until 1945 and as chairman from 1945 to 1953. He was the first leader of Communist Czechoslovakia from 1948 to 1953.

He was the 14th prime minister of Czechoslovakia from July 1946 until June 1948, the first Communist to hold the post. In June 1948, he was elected as Czechoslovakia's first Communist president, four months after the 1948 coup d'état in which his party seized power with the backing of the Soviet Union. He held the post until his death.

Early life

Childhood and youth 
Klement Gottwald was born either in Heroltice or Dědice (part of Vyškov) as the illegitimate son of a poor peasantwoman. The exact place of his birth remains unknown. Before World War I he was trained in Vienna as a carpenter but also actively participated in the activities of the Social Democratic youth movement.

Personal life 
Klement Gottwald was married to Marta Gottwaldová who, like him, came from a poor family and was an illegitimate child. Although his wife stood by him through his endeavours, and was his faithful companion, she never joined the Communist Party. They had one daughter, Marta.

First World War 
From 1915 to 1918 Gottwald was a soldier in the Austro-Hungarian Army. It is believed that he fought in the Battle of Zborov, which would mean that he fought there against future General and President Ludvík Svoboda, who fought on the side of the Czechoslovak Legion. Thomas Jakl of the Military History Institute called Gottwald's participation in Zborova a legend: Gottwald was in a hospital in Vienna during the time of the battle. In the summer of 1918, Gottwald deserted from the army. After the establishment of the first Czechoslovak Republic, he served for two years in the Czechoslovak Army. From 1920 to 1921 he worked in Rousinov as a cabinetmaker.

Career

Sports instructor and journalist 
After the collapse of the Union of Workers sports associations (SDTJ), the Communist-oriented party of the organization split off in 1921 and created the Federation of Worker's Sports Unions (FDTJ). Gottwald was able to unify the organization to gain considerable power in the local districts, and became the mayor of the 20th district of the FDTJ. In June 1921, he participated in the first Spartakiada in Prague. In September 1921 he moved from Rousinov to Banská Bystrica, where he became the editor of the communist magazine "Hlas Ľudu" (Voice of the people). At the same time, he was planning FDTJ events at the Banská Bystrica district. He became the local mayor of the district, and was the managing director of the 47th district of the FDJT. Later, he moved to Žilina and became editor in chief of the magazine Spartacus. In 1922 he moved to Vrútky, where by decision of the KSČ Central Committee, they merged a number of communist magazines and their editors together. In 1924, the editorial staff finally moved to Ostrava, where Gottwald finally resettled.

Beginning of political activity 

In 1926, Gottwald became a functionary of the Communist Party, and editor of the Communist Press. From 1926 to 1929 he worked in Prague, where he aided the Secretariat of the KSČ to form a pro-Moscow opposition against the then in power anti-Moscow leadership. From 1928 he was a member of the Comintern.  Following Comintern policy initiated by Stalin, he carried out the Bolshevization of the Party.

In February 1929, at the Fifth Congress of the KSČ, Gottwald was elected party general secretary, alongside Guttmann, Šverma, Slánský, Kopecký and the Reimans (known as "the Karlín boys").

In the second half of 1930, the Communist Party carried out a number of reforms in accordance and response with the changes in those of the foreign policy of the Soviet Union, namely the introduction of the policy of the formation of the "Popular front against Fascism". In September and October 1938, Gottwald was one of the main leaders of the opposition against the adoption of the Munich Agreement.

Exile to the USSR 
After the banning of the Communist Party, Gottwald emigrated to the Soviet Union in November 1938. While there, he opposed the party policy of backing the Molotov-Ribbentrop pact of 1939. After the attack on the Soviet Union in June 1941, Soviet leadership saw the front against fascism as a great opportunity to assert themselves in Czechoslovakia, promoting interest in supporting Gottwald after the liberation of Czechoslovakia. In 1943, Gottwald agreed with representatives of the Czechoslovak-government-in-exile located in London, along with President Edvard Beneš, to unify domestic and foreign anti-fascist resistance and form the National Front. This proved helpful for Gottwald as it helped secure Communist influence in post-war Czechoslovakia.

Return to Czechoslovakia and events leading up to the coup 
In 1945, Gottwald gave up the general secretary's post to Rudolf Slánský and was elected to the new position of party chairman. On 10 May 1945, Gottwald returned to Prague as the deputy premier under Zdeněk Fierlinger and as the chairman of the National Front.  In March 1946, he became prime minister after leading the KSČ to a 38% share of the vote. This was easily the best showing for a Czechoslovak party in a free election at the time; previously, no party had ever won more than 25 percent.

Gottwald was a firm supporter of the expulsion of ethnic Germans from Czechoslovakia, gaining mainstream credibility with many Czechs through the use of nationalist rhetoric, exhorting the population to "prepare for the final retribution for White Mountain, for the return of the Czech lands to the Czech people. We will expel for good all descendants of the alien German nobility."

Revolution 

By the summer of 1947, however, the KSČ's popularity had significantly dwindled, particularly after the Soviets pressured Czechoslovakia to turn down Marshall Plan aid after initially accepting it. Most observers believed Gottwald would be turned out of office at the elections due in May 1948. The Communists' dwindling popularity, combined with France and Italy dropping the Communists from their coalition governments, prompted Joseph Stalin to order Gottwald to begin efforts to eliminate parliamentary opposition to  Communism in Czechoslovakia.

Outwardly, though, Gottwald kept up the appearance of working within the system, announcing that he intended to lead the Communists to an absolute majority in the upcoming election—something no Czechoslovak party had ever done. The endgame began in February 1948, when a majority of the Cabinet directed the Communist interior minister, Václav Nosek, to stop packing the police force with Communists. Nosek ignored this directive, with Gottwald's support. In response, 12 non-Communist ministers resigned. They believed that without their support, Gottwald would be unable to govern and be forced to either give way or resign. Beneš initially supported their position, and refused to accept their resignations. Gottwald not only refused to resign, but demanded the appointment of a Communist-dominated government under threat of a general strike. His Communist colleagues occupied the offices of the non-Communist ministers.

On 25 February, Beneš, fearing Soviet intervention, gave in. He accepted the resignations of the non-Communist ministers and appointed a new government in accordance with Gottwald's specifications. Although ostensibly still a coalition, it was dominated by Communists and pro-Moscow Social Democrats. The other parties were still nominally represented, but with the exception of Foreign Minister Jan Masaryk they were fellow travellers handpicked by the Communists. From this date forward, Gottwald was effectively the most powerful man in Czechoslovakia.

On 9 May, the National Assembly, now a docile tool of the Communists, approved the so-called Ninth-of-May Constitution.  While it was not a completely Communist document, its Communist imprint was strong enough that Beneš refused to sign it. Later that month, elections were held in which voters were presented with a single list from the National Front, now a Communist-controlled patriotic organization.

Beneš resigned on 2 June. In accordance with the 1920 Constitution, Gottwald took over most presidential functions until 14 June, when he was formally elected as President.

Leadership of Czechoslovakia
Under his direction, Gottwald imposed the Stalinist Soviet model of government on the country. He nationalized the country's industry and collectivized its farms. There was considerable resistance within the government to Soviet influence on Czechoslovak politics. In response, Gottwald instigated a series of purges, first to remove non-communists, later to remove some communists as well. Some were executed. Prominent Communists who became victims of these purges and were defendants in the Prague Trials included Rudolf Slánský, the party's general secretary, Vlado Clementis (the Foreign Minister) and Gustáv Husák (the leader of an administrative body responsible for Slovakia), who was dismissed from office for "bourgeois nationalism". Slánský and Clementis were executed in December 1952, and hundreds of other government officials were sent to prison. Husák was rehabilitated in the 1960s and became the leader of Czechoslovakia in 1969.

In a famous photograph from 21 February 1948, described also in The Book of Laughter and Forgetting by Milan Kundera, Clementis stands next to Gottwald. When Clementis was charged in 1950, he was erased from the photograph (along with the photographer Karel Hájek) by the state propaganda department.

Death

Gottwald was a long-time alcoholic and suffered from heart disease caused by
syphilis that had gone untreated for several years. Shortly after attending Stalin's funeral on 9 March 1953, one of his arteries burst. He died five days later on 14 March 1953, aged 56. He was the first Czechoslovak president to die in office.

Gottwald's embalmed body was initially displayed in a mausoleum at the site of the Jan Žižka national monument in the district of Žižkov, Prague. In 1962, the personality cult ended and it was no longer deemed appropriate to show Gottwald's body. There are accounts that in 1962 Gottwald's body had blackened and was decomposing due to a botched embalming, although other witnesses have disputed this. His body was cremated, the ashes returned to the Žižka Monument and placed in a sarcophagus.

After the end of the communist period, Gottwald's ashes were removed from the Žižka Monument (in 1990) and placed in a common grave at Prague's Olšany Cemetery, together with the ashes of about 20 other communist leaders which had also originally been placed in the Žižka Monument. The Communist Party of Bohemia and Moravia now maintains that common grave.

Legacy

He was succeeded as de facto leader of Czechoslovakia by Antonín Novotný, who became First Secretary of the KSČ.  Antonín Zápotocký, who had been prime minister since 1948, succeeded Gottwald as president.

In tribute, Zlín, a city in Moravia, now the Czech Republic, was renamed Gottwaldov after him from 1949 to 1989. Zmiiv, a city in Kharkiv Oblast, Ukrainian SSR, was named Gotvald after him from 1976 to 1990.

A major square and park in Bratislava was named Gottwaldovo námestie after him, later becoming Námestie Slobody (Freedom square) immediately following the Velvet Revolution. The original eponym persists today, the square being referred to by locals as Gottko. A bridge in Prague that is now called Nuselský Most was once called Gottwaldův Most, and the abutting metro station now called Vyšehrad was called Gottwaldova.

A Czechoslovak 100 Koruna banknote issued on 1 October 1989 as part of the 1985–89 banknote series included a portrait of Gottwald. This note was so poorly received by Czechoslovaks that it was removed from official circulation on 31 December 1990 and was promptly replaced with the previous banknote issue of the same denomination.

In 2005 he was voted "The Greatest Villain" in the Největší Čech poll of the Czech Television (a program under the BBC licence 100 Greatest Britons). He received 26% of the votes.

Wiesenau in Brandenburg, (former East) Germany keeps a street named after Gottwald.

See also
 History of Czechoslovakia
 Order of Klement Gottwald
 Photo manipulation
Czechoslovak Communist party

References

Further reading
 August, František, and David Rees. Red star over Prague (1984).
 Pons, Silvio and Robert Service, eds. A Dictionary of 20th-Century Communism (2010) pp 345–348.
 
 Skilling, H. Gordon, ed. Czechoslovakia 1918–88: Seventy Years from Independence (Springer, 1991).
 Taborsky, Edward. Communism in Czechoslovakia, 1948-1960 (Princeton University Press, 2015).

External links
 

|-

|-

|-

|-

|-

1896 births
1953 deaths
People from Vyškov District
People from the Margraviate of Moravia
Leaders of the Communist Party of Czechoslovakia
Presidents of Czechoslovakia
Prime Ministers of Czechoslovakia
Members of the Chamber of Deputies of Czechoslovakia (1929–1935)
Members of the Chamber of Deputies of Czechoslovakia (1935–1939)
Members of the Interim National Assembly of Czechoslovakia
Members of the Constituent National Assembly of Czechoslovakia
Members of the National Assembly of Czechoslovakia (1948–1954)
Czech communists
Stalinism
Anti-revisionists
Collaborators with the Soviet Union
Austro-Hungarian military personnel of World War I
Czech people of World War II
Leaders who took power by coup
World War II political leaders
Communist Party of Czechoslovakia prime ministers
Czechoslovak emigrants to the Soviet Union
People granted political asylum in the Soviet Union
Burials at Olšany Cemetery
Czech editors
Czech magazine editors